Joško Janša (born 16 December 1900, date of death unknown) was a Slovenian cross-country skier. He competed in the men's 18 kilometre event at the 1928 Winter Olympics.

References

1900 births
Year of death missing
Slovenian male cross-country skiers
Olympic cross-country skiers of Yugoslavia
Cross-country skiers at the 1928 Winter Olympics
People from Kranjska Gora